Yuri Yakimenko (ru)
 Pavel Yakimkin (ru)
 Aleksandr Yakovlev (ru)
 Yuri Yakovlev (ru)
 Farvat Yakupov (ru)
 Dzhabrail Yamadaev
 Ruslan Yamadaev
 Sulim Yamadaev
 Valery Yanin (ru)
 Irina Yanina
 Aleksandr Yanklovich (ru)
 Aleksandr Yaroshenko (ru)
 Nikolai Yartsev (ru)
 Dzhafyas Yafarov (ru)
 Pyotr Yatsenko (ru)
 Anatoly Yatskov
 Igor Yatskov (ru)
 Sergey Yashkin (ru)
 Yunus-bek Yevkurov
 Sergey Yevlampiev (ru)
 Sergey Yevlanov (ru)
 Valery Yevnevich (ru)
 Vyacheslav Yevskin (ru)
 Mark Yevtyukhin
 Dmitry Yegorov (ru)
 Pyotr Yegorov (ru)
 Lyubov Yegorova
 Vladimir Yedamenko (ru)
 Vladimir Yelizarov (ru)
 Vladimir Yeliseev (ru)
 Dmitry Elistratov (ru)
 Aleksandr Yepaneshnikov (ru)
 Pyotr Yeremeev (ru)
 Oleg Yeremetsky (ru)
 Viktor Yerin
 Vadim Yermakov (ru)
 Vitaly Yermakov (ru)
 Oleg Yermakov (ru)
 Dmitry Yerofeev (ru)
 Ruben Yesayan
 Arkady Yefanov (ru)
 Mikhail Yefremov
 Vladimir Yurchenko (ru)
 Gleb Yurchenko (ru)
 Yuri Yurchenko (ru)
 Fyodor Yurchikhin
 Vasily Yuryev (ru)
 Damir Yusupov (ru)
 Sergey Yushkov (ru)

References 
 

Heroes Y